James Francis Henry (June 26, 1910 – August 15, 1976) was a pitcher in Major League Baseball who played between 1936 and 1939 for the Boston Red Sox (1936–37) and Philadelphia Phillies (1939). He was born in Danville, Virginia.

In a three-season career, Henry posted a 6–2 record with a 4.79 ERA in 33 appearances, including 11 starts, three complete games, eight games finished, one save, 51 strikeouts, 59 walks, and 114 innings of work.

Henry died in Memphis, Tennessee, of cancer at age 66.

References

External links

1910 births
1976 deaths
Baseball players from Virginia
Boston Red Sox players
Charlotte Hornets (baseball) players
Hartford Senators players
Major League Baseball pitchers
Memphis Chickasaws players
Meridian Bears players
Minneapolis Millers (baseball) players
Philadelphia Phillies players
Sportspeople from Danville, Virginia